The Royal Canadian Mint has made coins with various themes. Most recently, ice hockey has been used for many numismatic releases. The first known ice hockey coin was for the 1988 Winter Olympics. Issued on February 25, 1986, the coin featured a goalie on the coin. Edge lettering was also used for the coin, the first time that it was used on silver coins.

In the 1990s, the theme would be used more frequently. The first issue was in 1991 and was on a coin with a denomination of $200. The coin was titled A National Passion and it was issued as a tribute to the spirit and vitality of Canadian youth and the national game of hockey. The most noticeable example was for two of the Silver Dollar series. The Silver Dollar for 1993 and 1997 would feature hockey as its theme.

Logos from the Canadian National Hockey League franchises would start to appear on Canadian coinage. This would start in 2005 as part of various gift sets. The sets were similar to the O Canada set in terms of packaging, but the one difference is that the twenty-five cent coin had a team logo in colour. The first sets were issued for the 2005-2006 NHL regular season and the sets were issued for the Montreal Canadiens, Ottawa Senators, and the Toronto Maple Leafs. The following season, offerings included all six Canadian franchises. The sets would feature "vintage" logos, including the Vancouver Canucks first logo (which featured a stick and a puck) and the Senators logo from the 1920s.

Fifty Cents

Canadian Sports Series

Olympics
To commemorate the 1988 Winter Olympics, held in Calgary, Alberta, Canada, the Royal Canadian Mint issued five series of Olympic coins. Each series had two coins and the coin honouring hockey was featured in Series Two.

The coins were issued to help with the financing of the event. Edge lettering was used for the first time on Canadian coins. “XV OLYMPIC WINTER GAMES – JEUX OLYMPIQUES D’HIVER” appeared on all ten silver coins. There are existing varieties that have missed the edge lettering process.

Calgary Games

Vancouver Games

Circulation
All circulation coins had a face value of twenty five cents

Sterling Silver

Specifications

Mascot Sport Poses
Each Mascot sport pose coin features each of the Vancouver 2010 Olympic and Paralympic mascots: Miga, Quatchi and Sumi. But no coin features Mukmuk, a "sidekick" of these mascots. All coins had a face value of 50 cents, were packaged in a plastic sleeve, and the issue price was $9.95.

NHL coins

Twenty-Five Cents

Fifty Cents 

 NOTE: All legends sets consisted of four coins with images provided courtesy of the Hockey Hall of Fame

 NOTE: All coins featured a partial image of an athlete of the respective team on the coin.

One Dollar

NHL Goalie Mask Coins
In October 2008, the RCM issued six sterling silver coins with a $20 Face Value. Each coin had the goalie mask of one of the six Canadian hockey teams.  In the case of the Toronto Maple Leafs and Montreal Canadiens Goalie Mask coins, it is believed that the surviving mintage is less than 50.

Montreal Canadiens 100th Anniversary
Canadiens executive Ray Lalonde confirmed that in March 2009, more than 10 million copies of the Canadian one dollar coin will adorn the legendary Montreal Canadiens logo. On an additional note, Canada Post will also issue four million stamps honouring the Canadiens anniversary.

Four unique gold coins were produced by the RCM to honour the 100th anniversary of the Montreal Canadiens. The coins are on permanent display at the Centennial Plaza at the Bell Centre in Montreal. The coins have a face value of $1 and have the Canadiens centennial logo on the reverse. The coins are featured on memorial plaques dedicated to four legends: Howie Morenz, Maurice Richard, Jean Beliveau, and Guy Lafleur. The obverse is the Susanna Blunt effigy of Her Majesty Queen Elizabeth II. Each plaque also has tow circulation five cent coins marking the start and end of each player's career. The coins were gold-plated versions of the nickel aureate dollar used for circulating $1 coins.
A special edition proof silver dollar was also issued with two different types of packaging.

Starting in the autumn of 2008, the Royal Canadian Mint created six fifty cent coins embedded in a plastic sports card. The coins were double dated 1908 and 2008 to commemorate the Canadiens centennial. All the coins were distributed through the Jean Coutu Pharmacy chain in Quebec. All coins had a retail price of $9.95 each.

Silver Dollar
Two key moments in Hockey history have been commemorated on Canada's silver dollar series. The first of these coins was the Centennial of the Stanley Cup. The Cup was first presented in 1893 to the Montreal Amateur Athletic Association team by Lord Stanley. The RCM issued the coin in 1993, and the proof coin was in a black leatherette case, with a maroon insert and a Certificate of Authenticity. The Brilliant Uncirculated version was in a clear plastic outer case, with a black plastic insert and a silver sleeve.

To commemorate the 25th anniversary of Paul Henderson's series clinching goal against Russia, the RCM placed Henderson on its Silver Dollar for 1997. The RCM offered two gift packages: a sterling silver pin and Uncirculated dollar, and a numbered colour reproduction print and an Uncirculated Dollar.

100 Dollar Gold

200 Dollar Gold

Medallions
Starting in 1997, the Royal Canadian Mint started to sell hockey medallions to the public. To commemorate the induction of Mario Lemieux in the Hockey Hall of Fame, a set was issued honouring all three inductees. One set was issued in Sterling Silver while another was issued in Nickel. The success of the release led to future issues.

As a way of commemorating the retirement of Wayne Gretzky, a medallion was issued with a mintage of over 50,000. The medallions were $9.95 each and they were packaged in a blue sleeve with the number 99 in red on the packaging.

Canada Post
Starting in 2000, a series of stamps was issued to commemorate the All-Star Game in Toronto. The success of the series led to future stamp releases. Starting in 2001, the stamps were issued in a special collectors set. The stamps were packaged in a hard plastic case, with a hockey puck and corresponding medallions. These medallions were struck by the Royal Canadian Mint.

Hockey Hall of Fame

Wayne Gretzky

2009 IIHF World Junior Championships
The Royal Canadian Mint has produced the medals for the 2009 IIHF World Junior Hockey Championship. This event will take place in Ottawa from December 26, 2008 to January 5, 2009. For the IIHF World Junior Hockey Championship medals, which were designed in collaboration with the IIHF and Hockey Canada, the Mint cut each blank – which is a medal without a design – out of copper. After the distinctive Ottawa design was struck onto each blank twice on a manual press using several tons of pressure, the medals were given their distinguishing finish: the coveted championship medals are plated with 24kt gold while the second-place medals are silver-plated and the third-place medals are finished with a warm bronze tone. All medals are lacquered and bear a Maple Leaf which is coloured with red enamel.

The Mint also sourced the tournament's popular Player of the Game award, which this year is a uniquely Canadian-made acrylic and aluminum Hoselton sculpture, housed in a cherry wood box.

References

External links
 Canadian Coins Price Guide
 Royal Canadian Mint's Official Website
 Royal Canadian Mint Act
 Canadian Numismatic Association
 Numismatic Network Canada
 Canadian Coin News

Hockey
Ice hockey collectibles

fr:Monnaie royale canadienne